Oh Islam (translit. Wa Islamah, and also released as Love and Faith) is a 1961 Egyptian drama film directed by Enrico Bomba and Andrew Marton. The film was selected as the Egyptian entry for the Best Foreign Language Film at the 34th Academy Awards, but was not accepted as a nominee. The film was the first Egyptian film to be screened at the San Francisco International Film Festival.

Cast
Egyptians
 Ahmed Mazhar as Mahmoud (Qutuz)
 Rushdy Abaza as Baibars
 Lobna Abdel Aziz as Jihad 
 Emad Hamdy as Aybak
 Taheyya Kariokka as Shajar al-Durr
 Mahmoud el-Meliguy as Faris ad-Din Aktai
 Farid Shawki as Bltai
 Mahmoud el-Meliguy as Aktai
Italians
 Ema Andi
 Franco Carelli
 Federico Chentrens
 Mario Dionisi
 Luisa Mattioli
 Folco Lulli as Aktai
 Silvana Pampanini as Shajar al-Durr

See also
 List of submissions to the 34th Academy Awards for Best Foreign Language Film
 List of Egyptian submissions for the Academy Award for Best Foreign Language Film

References

External links
 

1961 films
1960s Arabic-language films
1961 drama films
Films directed by Andrew Marton
Films set in the 13th century
Egyptian drama films